Tuusulan Palloseura (abbreviated TuPS) is a sports club from Tuusula in Finland.  The club was formed in 1971 and their home ground is at the Tuusulan urheilukeskus.  The men's football first team currently plays in the Kolmonen (Third Division) while the ladies team plays in Section A of the Kakkonen.  The Chairman of TuPS is Jari Klemetti. In addition to football the club has been active in ice-hockey and ringette.

Background
Tuusulan Palloseura was founded on 29 November 1971 as a football club serving the South Tuusula area. The club has expanded from 30 members to more than 700 members.  In 2002 the club was awarded the quality seal in recognition of its high-quality youth activities.

TuPS has spent many seasons in the lower divisions of the Finnish football league.  The club now acts as one of the three feeder clubs to the Pallokerho Keski-Uusimaa club, that now serves as the joint representative team for Central Uusimaa. This side currently plays in the Kakkonen.

The highlight of the TuPS ladies team has been playing in the SM championship league in 2001.

Season to season

Club Structure
TuPS currently has 2 men's teams, 2 veteran's teams, 2 ladies teams, 12 boys teams and 5 girls team.

2010 season
TuPS Men's Team are competing in Section 3 (Lohko 3) of the Kolmonen administered by the Football Association of Finland  (Suomen Palloliitto) .  This is the fourth highest tier in the Finnish football system.  In 2009 Tuusulan Palloseura finished in seventh position in Section 2 of the Kolmonen (Third Division).

TuPS/2 are participating in Section 6 (Lohko 6) of the Kutonen administered by the Uusimaa SPL.

References and sources
Official Website
Finnish Wikipedia
Suomen Cup
TUPS (Tuusulan Palloseura) Facebook

Footnotes

Football clubs in Finland
Tuusula
1971 establishments in Finland